This is a list of Acts of the Parliament of England for the years 1700–1706.

For Acts passed during the period 1707–1800 see List of Acts of the Parliament of Great Britain.  See also the List of Acts of the Parliament of Scotland, the List of Acts of the Parliament of Ireland to 1700, and the List of Acts of the Parliament of Ireland, 1701–1800.

For Acts passed from 1801 onwards see List of Acts of the Parliament of the United Kingdom.  For Acts of the devolved parliaments and assemblies in the United Kingdom, see the List of Acts of the Scottish Parliament, the List of Acts of the Northern Ireland Assembly, and the List of Acts and Measures of the National Assembly for Wales; see also the List of Acts of the Parliament of Northern Ireland.

For medieval statutes, etc. that are not considered to be Acts of Parliament, see the List of English statutes.

The number shown after each Act's title is its chapter number.  Acts are cited using this number, preceded by the year(s) of the reign during which the relevant parliamentary session was held; thus the Union with Ireland Act 1800 is cited as "39 & 40 Geo. 3 c. 67", meaning the 67th Act passed during the session that started in the 39th year of the reign of George III and which finished in the 40th year of that reign.  Note that the modern convention is to use Arabic numerals in citations (thus "41 Geo. 3" rather than "41 Geo. III"). Acts of the last session of the Parliament of Great Britain and the first session of the Parliament of the United Kingdom are both cited as "41 Geo. 3".

Acts passed by the Parliament of England did not have a short title; however, some of these Acts have subsequently been given a short title by Acts of the Parliament of the United Kingdom (such as the Short Titles Act 1896).

Acts passed by the Parliament of England were deemed to have come into effect on the first day of the session in which they were passed.  Because of this, the years given in the list below may in fact be the year before a particular Act was passed.

1700 (12 & 13 Will. 3)

The 5th Parliament of William III. From 6 February 1701 until 11 November 1701.

Public Acts

| {{|Act of Settlement 1700|note1= (often referred to as Act of Settlement 1701)|public|2|12-06-1701|repealed=n|archived=n|An Act for the further Limitation of the Crown and better securing the Rights and Liberties of the Subject.}}

| {{|Privilege of Parliament Act 1700|public|3|12-06-1701|repealed=y|archived=n|An Act for preventing any Inconveniencies that may happen by Priviledge of Parliament|note4= }}

| {{|Plate Assay Act 1700|public|4|12-06-1701|repealed=y|archived=n|An Act for appointing Wardens and Assay Masters for assaying Wrought Plate in the Cities of York, Exeter, Bristol, Chester, and Norwich.}}

| {{|Returns to Parliament Act 1700|public|5|12-06-1701|repealed=y|archived=n|An Act for continuing a former Act to prevent false and Double Returns of Members to serve in Parliament.|note4= }}

| {{|Moss Troopers Act 1700|public|6|12-06-1701|repealed=y|archived=n|An Act for continuing the Acts therein mentioned, for preventing Theft and Rapine upon the Northern Borders of England.|note4= }}

| {{|British Museum Act 1700|public|7|12-06-1701|repealed=y|archived=n|An Act for the better Settling and Preserving the Library kept in the House at Westminster, called Cotton-house, in the Name and Family of the Cottons, for the Benefit of the Publick.}}

| {{|Militia Act 1700|public|8|12-06-1701|repealed=y|archived=n|An Act for raising the militia for one year, although the month's pay formerly advanced be not repaid.|note4= }}

| {{|Minehead Harbour Act 1700|public|9|12-06-1701|repealed=y|archived=n|An Act for recovering, securing, and keeping in repair the harbour of Minehead, for the benefit and support of the navigation and trade of this kingdom.}}

| {{|Taxation: Members of Parliament Act 1700|public|10|24-06-1701|repealed=y|archived=n|An Act for granting an aid to his Majesty for defraying the expence of his navy, guards, and garrisons for one year, and for other necessary occasions. }}

| {{|Taxation Act 1700|public|11|24-06-1701|repealed=y|archived=n|An Act for granting to his Majesty several duties upon low wines or spirits of the first extraction, and continuing several additional duties upon coffee, tea, chocolate, spices and pictures, and certain impositions upon hawkers, pedlars, and petty chapmen, and the duty of fifteen per centum upon muslins, and for improving the duties upon japanned and lacquered goods, and for continuing the coinage duty, and the several terms and purposes therein mentioned.|note4= }}

| {{|Appropriation of Revenue Act 1700|public|12|24-06-1701|repealed=y|archived=n|An Act for appropriating three thousand seven hundred pounds weekly, out of certain branches of excise, for publick uses, and for making a provision for the service of his Majesty's houshold and family, and other his necessary occasions.|note4= }}

| {{|Duchy of Cornwall Act 1700|public|13|24-06-1701|repealed=y|archived=n|An Act to enable his Majesty to make leases and copies of offices, lands and hereditaments, parcel of his Duchy of Cornwall, or annexed to the same; and for confirmation of leases already made.}}
}}

Private Acts

| {{|Elizabeth Viscountess Bulkeley's estate: sale of lands in Devon and Exeter for payment of debts.|private|2|12-06-1701|repealed=n|archived=n|An Act to enable the Right Honourable Elizabeth Viscountess Bulkley, of Cashells, in the Kingdom of Ireland, to sell certain Lands, in the County of Devon, and City and County of the City of Exon, for the Payment of Debts.}}

| {{|Robert Viscount Kilmorey's (an infant) estate: settlement of manors and lands in England upon a treaty of marriage.|private|3|12-06-1701|repealed=n|archived=n|An Act to enable Robert Lord Viscount Kilmorey, of the Kingdom of Ireland, (being an Infant) to settle divers Manors, Lands, and Hereditaments, in the Kingdom of England, upon a Treaty of Marriage.}}

| {{|Enabling Sir Charles Barrington to settle a jointure and make provision for his younger children.|private|4|12-06-1701|repealed=n|archived=n|An Act to enable Sir Charles Barrington Baronet to settle a Jointure, and make Provision for his Younger Children.}}

| {{|Enabling Sir Robert Marsham to dispose of lands in Hertfordshire and to settle other lands in Kent to the same uses.|private|5|12-06-1701|repealed=n|archived=n|An Act to enable Sir Robert Marsham Knight and Baronet to dispose of Lands in Hertfordshire; and to settle other Lands, of better Value, in Kent, to the same Uses as the Lands in Hertfordshire are settled.}}

| {{|Construction of King's Lynn hospitals and workhouses.|private|6|12-06-1701|repealed=y|archived=n|An Act for erecting Hospitals and Workhouses within the Borough of King's Lynn, in the County of Norfolke, for the better employing and maintaining the Poor there.}}

| {{|Norwich Court of Requests Act 1700|private|7|12-06-1701|repealed=n|archived=n|An Act for erecting a Court of Request, or Conscience, in the City and County of the City of Norwich, for the Recovery of small Debts under Forty Shillings.}}

| {{|Enabling Stephen Jermyn to make provision for younger children and for his eldest son's advancement.|private|8|12-06-1701|repealed=n|archived=n|An Act to enable Stephen Jermyn to make Provision for his Younger Children, and for the Advancement of his Eldest Son.}}

| {{|Norfolk: sale of manors and lands in South Pickenham and elsewhere, and purchase and settlement of others to the same uses.|private|9|12-06-1701|repealed=n|archived=n|An Act for the vesting and settling certain Manors and Lands in South Pickenham, and other Places in the County of Norfolke, in Trustees, to be sold; and for laying out the Monies arising by Sale thereof in the Purchase of other Lands, to be settled to such and the same Uses as the said Manors and Lands so to be vested are and stand settled.}}

| {{|Peter Trevisia's estate: discharge of a mortgage and maintenance for widow and child.|private|10|12-06-1701|repealed=n|archived=n|An Act for discharging a Mortgage upon the Estate of Peter Trevisa Esquire deceased, and providing a Maintenance for his Widow and Children.}}

| {{|Faster payment of Christopher Killiow's debts and raising portions and maintenance for his siblings in pursuance of his father's will.|private|11|06-02-1701|note2=|repealed=n|archived=n|}}

| {{|Humphrey Hide's estates: vesting in trustees for raising portions for his younger children.|private|12|06-02-1701|note3=|repealed=n|archived=n|}}

| {{|Furnishing the town of New Deal with fresh water.|private|13|06-02-1701|note3=|repealed=n|archived=n|}}

| {{|Richard Nodes' estate: sale of a message and lands in Stevenage (Hertfordshire) for making provision for his wife and children.|private|14|06-02-1701|note3=|repealed=n|archived=n|}}

| {{|William Davison's estate: sale for payment of debts and raising portions for children.|private|15|06-02-1701|note3=|repealed=n|archived=n|}}

| {{|Separating James Earl of Anglesea from his wife Countess Katharine by reason of his cruelty.|private|16|06-02-1701|note3=|repealed=n|archived=n|}}

| {{|Sir John Dillon's divorce from Mary Boyle.|private|17|06-02-1701|note3=|repealed=n|archived=n|}}

| {{|Ralph Box's divorce from Elizabeth Eyre and enabling him to marry again.|private|18|06-02-1701|note3=|repealed=n|archived=n|}}

| {{|John Fawconer's estate: sale of lands for payment of debts.|private|19|06-02-1701|note3=|repealed=n|archived=n|}}

| {{|New trustees for City of London's trust lands.|private|20|06-02-1701|note3=|repealed=n|archived=n|}}

| {{|Removal of Hertford County Gaol.|private|21|06-02-1701|note3=|repealed=n|archived=n|}}

| {{|Better performance of Henry Apsley's will.|private|22|06-02-1701|note3=|repealed=n|archived=n|}}

| {{|Thomas Bennet's estate in Newton cum Barton (Larton) (Cheshire): vesting in trustees for use of the poor of West Kirby pursuant to his will.|private|23|06-02-1701|note3=|repealed=n|archived=n|}}

| {{|Enabling William Vaughan and Frances Vaughan his intended wife, both infants, to perform marriage articles.|private|24|06-02-1701|note3=|repealed=n|archived=n|}}

| {{|Change of Ellis Mew's surname to the surname St. John.|private|25|06-02-1701|note3=|repealed=n|archived=n|}}

| {{|Declaring the authenticity of Sir Joseph Herne's will.|private|27|06-02-1701|note3=|repealed=n|archived=n|}}

| {{|Making good the deficiency of the charges of making a way out of Chancery Lane into Lincoln's Inn Fields (11 Will. 3 c. private 11).|private|26|06-02-1701|note3=|repealed=n|archived=n|}}

| {{|Naturalization of Jane Barkstead and vesting several mortgages and securities in her.|private|28|06-02-1701|note3=|repealed=n|archived=n|}}

| {{|Naturalization of Archibald Arthur and enabling him to dispose of his estate.|private|29|06-02-1701|note3=|repealed=n|archived=n|}}

| {{|Naturalization of Jacob Auguste Pyngot and others.|private|30|06-02-1701|note3=|repealed=n|archived=n|}}

| {{|Naturalization of Adrian Loftland and others.|private|31|06-02-1701|note3=|repealed=n|archived=n|}}

| {{|Enabling Sir Thomas Stanley to charge manors and lands in Lancashire with £300 for payment of his sisters' portions and his debts.|private|32|06-02-1701|note3=|repealed=n|archived=n|}}

| {{|James Deane's estate: sale for his and his family's benefit according to its settlement.|private|33|06-02-1701|note3=|repealed=n|archived=n|}}

| {{|Richard Bigg's estate in Hertfordshire and Bedfordshire: charging part with payment of debts.|private|34|06-02-1701|note3=|repealed=n|archived=n|}}

| {{|Naturalization of Peter Bagneol, Daniel Senault and others.|private|35|06-02-1701|note3=|repealed=n|archived=n|}}

| {{|Naturalization of Gaspar Cordoso, Herman Vant Wedde and others.|private|36|06-02-1701|note3=|repealed=n|archived=n|}}
}}

1701 (13 & 14 Will. 3)
The 6th Parliament of William III. From 30 December 1701 until 7 March 1702.

Public Acts

| {{|Mutiny Act 1701|public|2|02-03-1702|repealed=y|archived=n|An Act for punishing of officers and soldiers, that shall mutiny or desert in England or Ireland.}}

| {{|Correspondence with James the Pretender (High Treason) Act 1701|public|3|02-03-1702|repealed=y|archived=n|An Act for the Attainder of the pretended Prince of Wales of High Treason.}}

| {{|Affirmation by Quakers Act 1701|public|4|02-03-1702|repealed=y|archived=n|An Act for continuing an act, intituled, An Act that the Solemne Affirmation & Declaration of the People called Quakers shall be accepted instead of an Oath in the usual form. }}

| {{|Taxation Act 1701|public|5|07-03-1702|repealed=y|archived=n|An Act for granting an aid to his Majesty, by laying duties upon malt, mum, cyder and perry.}}

| {{|Security of the Succession, etc. Act 1701|public|6|07-03-1702|repealed=y|archived=n|An Act for the further security of his Majesty's person, and the succession of the crown in the protestant line, and for extinguishing the hopes of the pretended Prince of Wales, and all other pretenders, and their open and secret abettors.}}
}}

Private Acts

| {{|Lionel Earl of Orrery's estate: sale of lands and tenements for payment of debts and settlement of other lands.|private|2|07-03-1702|repealed=n|archived=n|An Act for enabling Lionel Earl of Orrery, in the Kingdom of Ireland, by Sale of certain Lands and Tenements, to raise Money, for Payment of his Debts; and settle other Lands to the Uses and Purposes in this Act mentioned.}}
}}

1702

1 Ann.
6th Parliament of William III. From the accession of Queen Anne on 8 March 1702 until 25 May 1702.

Public Acts

| {{|Demise of the Crown Act 1702|public|2|30-03-1702|repealed=n|archived=n|An Act for explaining a Clause in an Act made at the Parliament begun and holden at Westminster the two and twentieth of November in the Seventh year of the Reign of our Sovereign Lord King William the Third intituled "An Act for the better Security of His Majesties Royal Person and Government."}}

| {{|Assay of Plate Act 1702|public|3|30-03-1702|repealed=y|archived=n|An Act for continuing an Act made in the Eighth Year of his late Majesty's reign, for better preventing the counterfeiting the current coin of this kingdom.}}

| {{|Public Accounts Act 1702|public|4|30-03-1702|repealed=y|archived=n|An Act for taking, examining, and stating the Publick Accounts of the kingdom.|note4= }}

| {{|Apothecaries Act 1702|public|5|30-03-1702|repealed=y|archived=n|An Act for reviving the Act, intituled, An Act for exempting Apothecaries from serving the Offices of Constable, Scavenger, and other Public and Wardoffices, and from serving upon Juries.|note4= }}

| {{|Land Tax, Forfeited Estates, etc. Act 1702|public|6|06-05-1702|repealed=y|archived=n|An Act for granting an aid to her Majesty by divers subsidies and a land tax.|note4= }}

| {{|Taxation, etc. Act 1702|public|7|06-05-1702|repealed=y|archived=n|An Act for making good deficiencies, and for preserving the publick credit.|note4= }}

| {{|Union between England and Scotland Act 1702|public|8|06-05-1702|repealed=y|archived=n|An Act for enabling her Majesty to appoint commissioners to treat for an union between the kingdoms of England and Scotland.|note4= }}

| {{|Water Measure of Fruit Act 1702|public|9|06-05-1702|repealed=y|archived=n|An Act to ascertain the water measure of fruit.}}

| {{|Greenland Trade Act 1702|public|10|06-05-1702|repealed=y|archived=n|An Act for the enlarging and encouraging the Greenland trade.|note4= }}

| {{|Gold and Silver Thread Act 1702|public|11|06-05-1702|repealed=y|archived=n|An Act for continuing and amending the Act, made in the Ninth Year of His late Majesty's Reign, intituled, An Act for the settling and adjusting the Proportions of fine Silver and Silk, and for the better making of Gold and Silver Thread, and to prevent the Abuses of the Wire-drawers.|note4= }}

| {{|Bridges Act 1702|public|12|06-05-1702|repealed=y|archived=n|An Act to explain and alter the Act made in the two and twentieth year of King Henry the Eighth concerning the repairing and amending of Bridges in the Highways and for repealing an Act made in the Twenty third year of Queen Elizabeth for the re-edifying of Cardiffe Bridge in the County of Glamorgan and also for changing the day of Election of the Wardens and Assistants of Rochester Bridge.}}

| {{|Whitby Piers Act 1702|public|13|06-05-1702|repealed=y|archived=n|An Act for the re-building and repairing the Piers of the Town and Port of Whitby, in the County of York.}}

| {{|Derwent (Yorkshire) Navigation Act 1702|public|14|06-05-1702|repealed=y|archived=n|An Act for making the River Darwent, in the County of Yorke, navigable.}}

| {{|Salt Duties, etc. Act 1702|public|15|08-03-1702|note3=|repealed=y|archived=n| |note4= }}

| {{|Security of the Succession, etc. Act 1702|public|16|08-03-1702|note3=|repealed=y|archived=n| |note4= }}

| {{|Militia Act 1702|public|17|08-03-1702|note3=|repealed=y|archived=n| |note4= }}

| {{|Sheriffs Act 1702|public|18|08-03-1702|note3=|repealed=y|archived=n| |note4= }}

| {{|Insolvent Debtors Relief Act 1702|public|19|08-03-1702|note3=|repealed=y|archived=n||note4= }}

| {{|Carriage of Corn, etc. Act 1702|public|20|08-03-1702|note3=|repealed=y|archived=n|}}

| {{|Importation Act 1702|public|21|08-03-1702|note3=|repealed=y|archived=n| |note4= }}

| {{|Importation Act 1702|public|22|08-03-1702|note3=|repealed=y|archived=n| |note4= }}

| {{|Imprisonment of Certain Traitors Act 1702|public|23|08-03-1702|note3=|repealed=y|archived=n| |note4= }}

| {{|Protestant Children of Jews Act 1702|public|24|08-03-1702|note3=|repealed=y|archived=n|}}

| {{|Crown Lands, Forfeited Estates, Ireland Act 1702|public|25|08-03-1702|note3=|repealed=y|archived=n|}}

| {{|Purchasers of Forfeited Estates, Ireland Act 1702|public|26|08-03-1702|note3=|repealed=y|archived=n|An Act for the relief of the Protestant purchasers of the forfeited estates in Ireland.}}
}}

Private Acts
	Abraham Barnwell's estate: settlement for benefit of family and sale of part for raising portions for younger children and payment of his debts.	c. 43
	Better government of Balsall Hospital (Warwickshire) founded by Lady Katherine Leveson.	c. 24
	Bishop of Gloucester's estate: making of distinct and separate leases of certain manors and lands.	c. 42
	Confirmation and settling of Job Marston's charities.	c. 17
	Confirmation of a purchase made by Queen and of an exchange between her and the deans and canons of the King's free chapel within the castle of Windsor.	c. 9
	Construction of Sudbury (Suffolk) hospitals and workhouses and better employing the poor.	c. 32
	Enabling Edward Mansell to raise a further £1000 on a mortgage of the impropriate rectory of Llanriddian for payment of debts.	c. 35
	Enabling Jeffery Palmer to settle a jointure on Elizabeth his wife.	c. 19
	Enabling Sir William Meredith to sell lands in Ashley (Cheshire) after settling other lands in lieu.	c. 3
	Enabling the Dean and Chapter of St. Peter's Cathedral, Exeter, and their farmers and tenants, to make leases of and in Culmstock manor (Devon).	c. 27
	Enabling the elder and the younger Robert Apreece to raise money out of their estate for payment of debts, including that due to the Queen.	c. 16
	Enabling Warner Lee to make a jointure on his marriage.	c. 6
	Enlarging the time for John Hill and his wife to enter their claims before the trustees for sale of the forfeited estates in Ireland concerning a judgment against Robert Grace; relief of creditors of John Grace and the widow, Protestant children and creditors of the late Sir Patrick Trant with relation to the said forfeited estates; indemnifying the Earl of Carlingford concerning mortgage money owed by him to Sir Patrick Trant.	c. 51
	Enlarging the time for Rebecca Viscountess Falkland, of Scotland, to enter her claim before the trustees for the forfeited estates in Ireland to a mortgage upon part of them.	c. 68
	Enlarging the time for Sir Stephen Fox to make his claim before the trustees for forfeited estates in Ireland.	c. 67
	Exempting Arthur French and his wife Sarah from accounting to the trustees for the forfeited estates in Ireland for the personal estate of Irriel Farrel, deceased.	c. 69
	Extending the time for Cesar Bradshaw to prosecute his claim before the trustees for the Irish forfeitures.	c. 55
	Extending time for Lord Haversham to make his claim before the trustees for forfeited estates in Ireland.	c. 36
	Francis Purefoy's estate: sale of lands and tithes for payment of debts.	c. 4
	Francis Wightwicke's (an infant) estate in Staffordshire: vesting in trustees for settling and conveying upon his marriage.	c. 7
	Henry Earl of Thomond's estate in Ireland: enabling his mother Lady Henrietta Obrien to make leases for discharging incumbrances and a £4000 charge for his sister's portion.	c. 1
	Henry Pawlett's estate: vesting in trustees for making provision for him (a lunatic) and his next heir and relations.	c. 46
	Humphrey Bury's estate: sale of part for paying off a mortgage and a portion.	c. 31
	James Hunt's estate: sale of timber for payment of debts and legacies.	c. 34
	John and Robert Window's estate: sale and application of purchase money.	c. 45
	John Earl of Exeter's estate: sale of manors and lands for payment of debts and performance of his will.	c. 10
	Making provision for Protestant children of Earl of Clanriccard and Lord Bophin.	c. 39
	Mary Johnson's estate (Surrey, Sussex): sale of land for payment of debts of her husband William Johnson and settling his estate upon her and her children clear of incumbrances.	c. 50
	Montagu Earl of Abingdon's estate: sale of lands and purchase of others	c. 11
	More effectual settlement of estate of John Stone of Brightwell Baldwin (Oxfordshire).	c. 30
	Naturalization of Daniel Van Ryssen and others.	c. 78
	Naturalization of de Bacolon, de Lannay, des Fourneaux and others.	c. 76
	Naturalization of Stephen Benovad, John Girard and others.	c. 77
	Philip Savage's recompense for charge of outlawries and for attending the trustees for forfeited estates in Ireland.	c. 71
	Relief of Captain Richard Wolseley and other Protestant lessees in Ireland.	c. 66
	Relief of Captain Thomas Bellew for forfeited estates in Ireland.	c. 21
	Relief of Charlotte Talbot for forfeited estates in Ireland.	c. 70
	Relief of Colonel Henry Lutterell for forfeited estates in Ireland.	c. 26
	Relief of Dennis Molony for forfeited estates in Ireland.	c. 54
	Relief of Dorothy Dowager Baroness of Upper Ossory and Captain James Roche with relation to the Irish forfeitures.	c. 12
	Relief of Edward Nugent for forfeited estates in Ireland.	c. 52
	Relief of Edward Singleton for forfeited estates in Ireland.	c. 22
	Relief of Frances Countess of Tyrconnel of Ireland.	c. 2
	Relief of Francis Earl of Carlingford against outlawries in Tipperary (Ireland).	c. 38
	Relief of Francis Spring and other Protestant tenants of the forfeited estates in Ireland; for confirming a Protestant settlement at Portarlington and a charity at Middleton (County Cork), and relief of Alice Dowager Countess of Drogheda and Sir John Dillon.	c. 58
	Relief of Hannah MacDonnell for forfeited estates in Ireland.	c. 20
	Relief of Ignatius Gold and his family for forfeited estates in Ireland.	c. 59
	Relief of James Eustace, Agmondisham Vesey, George Field and Thomas Brigstock for forfeited estates in Ireland.	c. 57
	Relief of Jane Lavallin for forfeited estates in Ireland.	c. 56
	Relief of John Ellis for forfeited estates in Ireland.	c. 75
	Relief of Joseph Mitchel for forfeited estates in Ireland.	c. 53
	Relief of Katherine Harris or Kife for forfeited estates in Ireland.	c. 64
	Relief of Katherine O'Brien and her children for forfeited estates in Ireland.	c. 62
	Relief of Mary Vernon for forfeited estates in Ireland.	c. 61
	Relief of Maurice Annesley for forfeited estates in Ireland.	c. 72
	Relief of Nicholas Bagenal for forfeited estates in Ireland.	c. 25
	Relief of Robert Edgworth for forfeited estates in Ireland.	c. 49
	Relief of Sir Redmond Everard, Peter Fagan, and Sir Anthony Mullady's Protestant children for forfeited estates in Ireland.	c. 47
	Relief of Sir Thomas Domville for forfeited estates in Ireland.	c. 37
	Relief of Sir William Ashurst for forfeited estates in Ireland.	c. 60
	Relief of Susanna Smith for forfeited estates in Ireland.	c. 65
	Relief of Thomas and Katherine Plunkett for forfeited estates in Ireland and reversal of outlawries against John Mapas and Lawrence Fitz-Gerald.	c. 74
	Relief of Thomas Earl of Limerick and Euphemia Dowager Countess of Limerick for forfeited estates in Ireland.	c. 40
	Relief of Thomas Keightley for forfeited estates in Ireland.	c. 18
	Relief of Thomas Lee and other executors of Sir John Heley and Peter Goodwin for forfeited estates in Ireland.	c. 73
	Relief of William Spencer and Lord Kenmare's wife and children for forfeited estates in Ireland.	c. 63
	Relief of William Viscount Montjoy for forfeited estates in Ireland.	c. 48
	Sale of Attingham Manor (Salop.) and settling Selly Hall Farm and a moiety of Temple Lawrne Manor (Worcestershire) in lieu thereof.	c. 13
	Sale of Bedfordshire and Middlesex lands and purchasing of others to be settled to the same uses.	c. 29
	Sale of lands in Whitchurch parish (Cheshire) for paying off incumbrances.	c. 5
	Sale of lands in Yorkshire for raising Henrietta Tempest's portion.	c. 33
	Sarah Verdon's estate in Norfolk: enabling sale by Rebecca Windham.	c. 41
	Sir William Powel's estate: raising portions for younger children of his daughter Dame Mary Williams and enabling her eldest son William to make a jointure for a wife.	c. 28
	Stephen and Dorothy Soam's estate: sale of part for payment of his debts and portions for two of their younger children.	c. 15
	Suffolk Place, Southwark, improvement.	c. 44
	Thomas Rose's estate: confirmation of title to lands called Rempstone,	c. 8
	William Adams' estate: charging with portions and maintenance for his children William and Elizabeth.	c. 14
	William and Katherine Mathew's estate: sale.	c. 23

1 Ann. St. 2
1st session of the 1st Parliament of Queen Anne. 20 October 1702 to 27 February 1703.

Public Acts
See 

| {{|Settlement on Prince George Act 1702|public|2|note2=|27-02-1703|repealed=y|archived=n|An Act to enable Her Majesty to settle a Revenue, for supporting the Dignity of his Royal Highness Prince George Hereditary of Denmarke, in case he shall survive Her Majesty.|note4= }}

| {{|Taxation Act 1702|public|3|note2=|27-02-1703|repealed=y|archived=n|An Act for granting a Supply to Her Majesty, by several Duties imposed upon Malt, Mum, Cyder, and Perry.|note4= }}

| {{|Taxation Act 1702|public|4|note2=|27-02-1703|repealed=y|archived=n|An Act for continuing the Duties upon Coals, Culm, and Cinders.|note4= }}

| {{|Taxation Act 1702|public|5|note2=|27-02-1703|repealed=y|archived=n|An Act for granting an Aid to Her Majesty, by Sale of several Annuities at the Exchequer, for carrying on the War against France and Spain.|note4= }}

| {{|Escape of Debtors from Prison Act 1702|public|6|27-02-1703|repealed=y|archived=n|An Act for the better preventing Escapes out of The Queen's Bench and Fleet Prisons.}}

| {{|Yarmouth Haven and Pier Repairs (Effect of Change in Corporate Name) Act 1702|public|7|27-02-1703|repealed=y|archived=n|An Act for explaining and making effectual a late Statute concerning the Haven and Piers of the Borough of Great Yarmouth, and for concerning the Rights and Privileges of the said Borough.}}

| {{|Importation Act 1702|public|8|27-02-1703|repealed=y|archived=n| An Act for Explanation of a Clause in One Act made in the Seventh Year of His late Majesty's Reign, relating to Borelaps, and to take off the additional Subsidy upon Irish Linen.|note4= }}

| {{|Witnesses on Trial for Treason, etc. Act 1702|public|9|27-02-1703|repealed=y|archived=n|An Act for punishing of Accessaries to Felonies, and Receivers of stolen Goods; and to prevent the wilful burning and destroying of Ships.}}

| {{|Essex Roads Act 1702|public|10|27-02-1703|repealed=y|archived=n|An Act for the better repairing and amending the Highways, from the North End of Thornwood Common to Woodford, in the County of Essex.}}

| {{|River Cham or Grant, Cambridge Act 1702|public|11|27-02-1703|repealed=y|archived=n|An Act for making the River Cham, alias Grant, in the County of Cambridge, more navigable, from Hyth-Ferry to The Queen's Mill, in the University and Town of Cambridge.}}

| {{|Completing Saint Paul's etc. Act 1702|public|12|27-02-1703|repealed=y|archived=n|An Act for the finishing and adorning the Cathedral Church of St. Paul's, London.}}

| {{|Continuance of Acts, 1702|public|13|27-02-1703|repealed=y|archived=n|An Act for continuing former Acts, for exporting Leather, and for Ease of Jurors; and for reviving and making more effectual an Act relating to Vagrants.|note4= }}

| {{|Distillation, etc. Act 1702|public|14|27-02-1703|repealed=y|archived=n|An Act for encouraging the Consumption of Malted Corn, and for the better preventing the Running of French and Foreign Brandy.|note4= }}

| {{|Militia Act 1702|public|15|27-02-1703|repealed=y|archived=n|An Act for the raising the Militia of this Kingdom for the Year One Thousand Seven Hundred and Three, notwithstanding the Month's Pay formerly advanced be not re-paid.|note4= }}

| {{|Edward Whitaker, Public Accountant Act 1702|public|16|27-02-1703|repealed=y|archived=n|An Act to oblige Edward Whitaker to accompt for such Sums of Public Money as hath been received by him.|note4= }}

| {{|Taxation Act 1702|public|17|27-02-1703|repealed=y|archived=n|An Act for granting to Her Majesty several Subsidies, for carrying on the War against France and Spain.|note4= }}

| {{|Crown Lands, Forfeited Estates (Ireland) Act 1702|public|18|27-02-1703|repealed=y|archived=n|An Act for advancing the Sale of the forfeited Estates in Ireland; and for vesting such as remain unsold by the present Trustees in Her Majesty, Her Heirs and Successors, for such Uses as the same were before vested in the said Trustees; and for the more effectual selling and setting the said Estates to Protestants; and for explaining the several Acts relating to the Lord Bophin and Sir Redmond Everard.}}

| {{|Stamps Act 1702|public|19|27-02-1703|repealed=y|archived=n|An Act for preventing Frauds in Her Majesty's Duties upon stampt Vellum, Parchment, and Paper.}}

| {{|Mutiny Act 1702|public|20|27-02-1703|repealed=y|archived=n|An Act for punishing Officers and Soldiers who shall mutiny, or desert Her Majesty's Service, in England or Ireland; and for punishing false Musters; and for better Payment of Quarters in England.|note4= }}

| {{|Treason Act 1702|public|21|27-02-1703|repealed=n|archived=n|An Act for enlarging the Time for taking the Oath of Abjuration; and also for re-capacitating and indemnifying such Persons as have not taken the same by the Time limited, and shall take the same by a Time to be appointed; and for the further Security of Her Majesty's Person, and the Succession of the Crown in the Protestant Line; and for extinguishing the Hopes of the pretended Prince of Wales, and all other Pretenders, and their open and secret Abettors.}}

| {{|Woollen Manufactures Act 1702|public|22|27-02-1703|repealed=y|archived=n|An Act for the more effectual preventing the Abuses and Frauds of Persons employed in the working up the Woollen, Linen, Fustian, Cotton, and Iron Manufactures of this Kingdom.}}

| {{|Public Accounts Act 1702|public|23|27-02-1703|repealed=y|archived=n|An Act for taking, examining, and stating, the Public Accompts of the Kingdom.|note4= }}

| {{|Debts Due to the Army Act 1702|public|24|27-02-1703|repealed=y|archived=n|An Act for reviving and continuing the late Acts, for appointing Commissioners, to take, examine, and determine, the Debts due to the Army, and for Transport Service; and also an Account of the Prizes taken during the late War.|note4= }}
}}

Private Acts

| {{|William Peachey's estate: sale of part for payment of legacies.|private|2|23-12-1702|repealed=n|archived=n|n Act for Sale of Part of the Estate late of William Peachy Esquire deceased, for Payment of Legacies charged thereupon.}}

| {{|Henry Duke of Beaufort's estate: settlement according to his marriage agreement.|private|3|27-02-1703|repealed=n|archived=n|An Act for settling divers Manors, Lands, and Hereditaments, the Estate of Henry Duke of Beaufort, according to Agreements made upon his Marriage, and for other Purposes in the said Act mentioned.}}

| {{|Sir Thomas Brograve's estate (Hertfordshire): sale of lands and settlement of others in lieu.|private|4|20-10-1702|note3=|repealed=n|archived=n|}}

| {{|Bishopric of Chichester's estate: extension of time to lease houses and ground in and near Chancery Lane.|private|5|20-10-1702|note3=|repealed=n|archived=n|}}

| {{|Enabling Sir Edward Williams to sell manors and lands in Brecknockshire and Radnorshire for payment of debts.|private|6|20-10-1702|note3=|repealed=n|archived=n|}}

| {{|Way from Chancery Lane to Lincoln's Inn Fields: better collecting of duties granted for making the way and determining them when the parties concerned are paid.|private|7|20-10-1702|note3=|repealed=n|archived=n|}}

| {{|Thomas Fane's estate: payment of an annuity to Mildmay Fane for his maintenance and education until he is twenty-one years old.|private|8|20-10-1702|note3=|repealed=n|archived=n|}}

| {{|Enabling Richard Lord Bulkeley Viscount Cashels and his son Richard Bulkeley to make a marriage settlement for Richard Bulkeley.|private|9|20-10-1702|note3=|repealed=n|archived=n|}}

| {{|Confirmation of a partition made in 1634 between Sir Edmond Fowler and his wife Dame Ann and Elizabeth Buggin of manors and lands in Kent.|private|10|20-10-1702|note3=|repealed=n|archived=n|}}

| {{|Incorporation of persons for the better providing for and setting at work the poor of Gloucester.|private|11|20-10-1702|note3=|repealed=n|archived=n|}}

| {{|Enabling Andrew Hacket to sell lands in Staffordshire, Warwickshire and Lichfield for making provision for his younger children, upon settling another estate in Stroxton (Lincolnshire) to the same uses.|private|12|20-10-1702|note3=|repealed=n|archived=n|}}

| {{|Jonathon Castleman's estate: making provision for younger children and correcting an omission in his father's will of a power to make leases.|private|13|20-10-1702|note3=|repealed=n|archived=n|}}

| {{|Enabling William Colman and others to sell lands for payment of debts and legacies of William Stawell.|private|14|20-10-1702|note3=|repealed=n|archived=n|}}

| {{|John Cowper's estate in Essex: sale for payment of debts and legacies.|private|15|20-10-1702|note3=|repealed=n|archived=n|}}

| {{|John Goddard's estate: better settlement for benefit of John and Mary, his children, during their minority.|private|16|20-10-1702|note3=|repealed=n|archived=n|}}

| {{|Confirmation of the division of a third part of manor of Burton Dassett (Warwickshire).|private|17|20-10-1702|note3=|repealed=n|archived=n|}}

| {{|Enabling the executrix of James Hoare to pay a sum in discharge of a trust reposed in her by his will.|private|18|20-10-1702|note3=|repealed=n|archived=n|}}

| {{|Enabling Charles Aldworth to sell lands for payment of his father's debts and his sister's portions.|private|19|20-10-1702|note3=|repealed=n|archived=n|}}

| {{|Charles Morris' estate: sale of part for payment of debts and making provision for younger children.|private|20|20-10-1702|note3=|repealed=n|archived=n|}}

| {{|Improvement of a piece of ground in St. Martin-in-the-Fields parish for use of the poor and for other purposes.|private|21|20-10-1702|note3=|repealed=n|archived=n|}}

| {{|James Supple's estate:enabling devisees to make leases for improvement.|private|22|20-10-1702|note3=|repealed=n|archived=n|}}

| {{|Exchange of lands in Brampton (Northamptonshire) for lands in Wickham (Lincolnshire).|private|23|20-10-1702|note3=|repealed=n|archived=n|}}

| {{|John Loane's estate: better execution of his will, sale of part for payment of debts and legacies and preservation of the residue.|private|24|20-10-1702|note3=|repealed=n|archived=n|}}

| {{|Estate of Agmondisham Vesey and his daughters Ann and Henrietta in Kildare: sale for payment of debts and empowering Agmondisham to make leases.|private|25|20-10-1702|note3=|repealed=n|archived=n|}}

| {{|Sale of several estates for payment of debts and disposing of the residue money for the benefit of Giles Loane and other infants pursuant to their father's will.|private|26|20-10-1702|note3=|repealed=n|archived=n|}}

| {{|Enabling John Arderne to pay his father's debts and make provision for his brother and sister.|private|27|20-10-1702|note3=|repealed=n|archived=n|}}

| {{|Philip Caldecot's estate: mortgage of lands in Dorset for payment of debts and further provision for younger children.|private|28|20-10-1702|note3=|repealed=n|archived=n|}}

| {{|Charging Thomas Lister's estate with maintenance of his nine children.|private|29|20-10-1702|note3=|repealed=n|archived=n|}}

| {{|Setting aside a settlement in order that William Butler may have a good conveyance of lands from Raphael Whistler.|private|30|20-10-1702|note3=|repealed=n|archived=n|}}

| {{|Edward Owen's estate: sale of lands for payment of debts.|private|31|20-10-1702|note3=|repealed=n|archived=n|}}

| {{|Toby Hodson's estate: vesting in trustees for payment of debts and making provision for himself (a lunatic), his wife and son.|private|32|20-10-1702|note3=|repealed=n|archived=n|}}

| {{|Naturalization of Nicholas Wayfoort, Peter Le Blanc and Jacob Sanderfelt.|private|33|20-10-1702|note3=|repealed=n|archived=n|}}
}}

1703 (2 & 3 Ann.)

Public Acts

| {{|Dover Harbour Act 1703|public|7|09-11-1703|note3=|repealed=y|archived=n|}}
| {{|Duties on Salt Act 1703|public|16|09-11-1703|note3=|repealed=y|archived=n| |note4= }}
| {{|Forfeited Estates Ireland Act 1703|public|19|09-11-1703|note3=|repealed=y|archived=n| |note4= }}
| {{|Importation Act 1703|public|15|09-11-1703|note3=|repealed=y|archived=n| |note4= }}
| {{|Insolvent Debtors Relief Act 1703|public|10|09-11-1703|note3=|repealed=y|archived=n| |note4= }}
| {{|Militia Act 1703|public|14|09-11-1703|note3=|repealed=y|archived=n| |note4= }}

| {{|Mutiny Act 1703|public|17|09-11-1703|note3=|repealed=y|archived=n| |note4= }}
| {{|Navigation Act 1703|public|6|09-11-1703|note3=|repealed=y|archived=n|}}
| {{|Privilege of Parliament Act 1703|public|18|09-11-1703|note3=|repealed=y|archived=n| |note4= }}
| {{|Public Accountants Act 1703|public|11|09-11-1703|note3=|repealed=y|archived=n| |note4= }}

| {{|Queen Anne's Bounty Act 1703|public|20|09-11-1703|note3=|repealed=y|archived=n|An Act for makeing more effectuall Her Majesties Gracious Intencions for the Augmentacion of the Maintenance of the Poor Clergy by enabling Her Majesty to grant in Perpetuity the Revenues of the First Fruits and Tenths and also for enabling any other Persons to make Grants for the same Purpose.}}
| {{|Recruiting Act 1703|public|13|09-11-1703|note3=|repealed=y|archived=n|An Act for raising Recruits for the Land Forces and Marines and for dispensing with Part of the Act for the Incouragement and Increase of Shipping and Navigation during the present Warr.|note4= }}
| {{|Taxation Act 1703|public|1|09-11-1703|note3=|repealed=y|archived=n| |note4= }}
| {{|Taxation Act 1703|public|2|09-11-1703|note3=|repealed=y|archived=n| |note4= }}
| {{|Taxation Act 1703|public|3|09-11-1703|note3=|repealed=y|archived=n| |note4= }}

| {{|Taxation Act 1703|public|18|09-11-1703|note3=|repealed=y|archived=n| |note4= }}
| {{|Wills Act 1703|public|5|09-11-1703|note3=|repealed=y|archived=n| |note4= }}
| {{|Worcester: Poor Relief, Burial Ground and Hopmarket Act 1703|public|8|09-11-1703|note3=|repealed=y|archived=n|}}
| {{|Yorkshire (West Riding) Land Registry Act 1703|public|4|09-11-1703|note3=|repealed=y|archived=n|}}

| {{|Forfeited estates, Ireland, &c. Act 1867|public|21|09-11-1703|note3=|repealed=y|archived=n| |note4= }}
}}

Private Acts
	Ambrose Andrews' estate: charging with money for payment of debts and correction of settlement for making a jointure and leases.	c. 36
	Confirmation and better execution of articles and agreements for disposition and division of Lord Jermyn's estate among his coheirs.	c. 9
	Confirmation of a partition and agreement concerning Sir Thomas Style's estate.	c. 37
	Confirmation of execution of a certain agreement between Ralph Lord Grey and Lord Charles Ossulstone and Lady Mary his wife, concerning lands in Northumberland, Middlesex and the City of London, and also between Lord Grey and Lawrence Earl of Rochester concerning lands in Northumberland, Durham and Berwick-upon-Tweed.	c. 4
	Correction of the defect of the execution of a power in Sir John Ivory, deceased, for making provision for his younger children.	c. 10
	Earl of Warwick and Holland's estate: enabling his guardian to make leases of messuages in or near West Smithfield during his minority.	c. 2
	Enabling Arabella Foot to purchase lands for benefit of her son Topham with his money.	c. 22
	Enabling Bernard Cotton to sell part of his estate for payment of debts and confirming conveyances already made by himself and trustees.	c. 35
	Enabling George Evelyn to raise portions for siblings.	c. 40
	Enabling John Jenkins to sell lands in Durham and Northumberland for payment of debts.	c. 20
	Enabling Robert Cawdron to settle part of his estate for raising portions for his younger children.	c. 17
	Enabling Sir George Wheeler to make leases of some houses and ground in Channon Row in Westminster.	c. 7
	Enabling Sir John Astley to make a jointure upon his marriage during his minority and to buy in any rentcharge or incumbrance upon his estate.	c. 8
	Enabling Sir John Cowper and Anthony Henly to make a partition and grant building leases of several messuages and tenements in Lincoln's Inn Fields (Middlesex).	c. 31
	Enabling Sir Thomas Tipping to sell the manor of Ickford (Buckinghamshire) for payment of debts, and purchasing other lands to be settled to the same uses.	c. 11
	Enabling the Treasury to compound with John Ferrar for a debt due from him as surety for John Mason late Receiver General for the County of Cambridge and Isle of Ely.	c. 23
	Estate in Ireland of the Company for making Hollow Sword Blades in England.	c. 12
	Estates of Ralph Earl Montague and Simon Motton and others: confirmation of several exchanges of lands in Geddington (Northamptonshire).	c. 3
	For better securing and vesting in Giles Frampton the manor and farm of Moorton alias Moreton and Hurst (Dorset) and other lands of William Frampton deceased and in such as are entitled in remainder after him upon Tregonwell Frampton's death.	c. 39
	Freedom of "Golden Starr" and "Bull," taken as prize, to trade as English ships.3	c. 49
	Further recompensing John Baker and family for the services of Colonel Baker at Londonderry and stating accounts of the late receivers of rents and profits of forfeited estates in Ireland.	c. 48
	George Lord Carteret's estate: sale of estates in Cornwall and Devon and several leasehold estates for raising portions for younger children and purchasing other lands.	c. 5
	Henry Lord Viscount Dillon's estate in Ireland: sale for payment of debts and settling an equivalent on his wife for her jointure.	c. 6
	James Torr's estate: sale of part for payment of debts and settlement of the other part.	c. 41
	John and Robert Holden's estate: sale of part for payment of debts and disposing of younger children apprentices.	c. 26
	John Briscoe's estate in Cumberland: improvement.	c. 44
	John Hawe's estate in Staffordshire and Warwickshire: setting aside voluntary settlements, settling part on John Hawe and his son, making provision for his son's and daughter's maintenance, raising a portion for his daughter and selling the residue for payment of his debts.	c. 46
	Making good the provision intended for Captain James Roch out of the forfeited estates in Ireland and restoring to the bishopric of Cloyne (Ireland) the manors and lands of Donomore.	c. 45
	Making void certain uses, estates and trusts, limited in the marriage settlement of Henry Awdley of certain manors and lands contained in that settlement and settling others to the same uses.	c. 16
	Mary and William Bowdler's estate: vesting manor of Michael Church (Radnorshire) and other lands in Salop. in trustees for payment of William's debts and making provision for his younger children.	c. 24
	Mathew Holworthy's estate: sale of manors and lands and purchase of others to be limited to the same uses.	c. 34
	Naturalization of Daniel Barbier, John Kerron du Chesne and others.	c. 50
	Naturalization of de Saint Leger, de la Grange, Wadden and others.	c. 29
	Naturalization of Elizabeth Cholmondeley.	c. 1
	Naturalization of Henry de Hant, George Chabot and others.	c. 51
	Naturalization of Isaac Kops.	c. 27
	Naturalization of Rene Rance, Mathew Decker and others.	c. 28
	Robert and William Coke's estate: payment of Robert's debts and making provision for Robert's wife and younger children.	c. 42
	Sale of estate of John Digby in Buckinghamshire and division of proceeds between Sir John Conway and Richard Mostyn, settling estate of Sir John Conway in Flintshire and making provision for his children.	c. 47
	Setting aside a voluntary settlement made by Mary Fermor and ratifying a partition of manors of Mersham and Pett and lands in Sussex between her, Bartholomew Walmesley and others.	c. 43
	Settling manor of Creech (Somerset) in trustees and enabling them to renew leases for maintenance of younger sons of William Keyts during their minority.	c. 25
	Sir Charles Bickerstaffe's estates: sale for payment of debts and making provision for wife and daughter.	c. 13
	Sir Christopher Philipson's estate: sale of part for payment of debts and charging part with maintenance for a lunatic daughter.	c. 32
	Sir Peter and Thomas Tyrrell's estate: vesting manor of Hanslop and Castlethrop and all their other lands in Buckinghamshire in trustees for sale of part for payment of debts and settling other lands in lieu.	c. 30
	Sir Robert Kemp's estate: vesting lands in Essex in trustees for benefit of the children and grandchildren of Elizabeth Outlaw, one of his sisters.	c. 18
	Thomas Harlackendon Bowes' estate: vesting part in trustees for payment of debts and legacies and preserving residue for Thomas Bowes, an infant.	c. 21
	Thomas Lamplough's estate: settlement pursuant to his marriage articles and provision for younger children.	c. 38
	Thomas Legh's estate: vesting in trustees for payment of debts, perfecting his purchases and better effecting purposes of his will.	c. 15
	William Adams' estate: sale of lands in Charlewelton (Northamptonshire) for payment of debts and portions for younger siblings and settling other lands upon his wife and children in lieu.	c. 14
	William and Mary Jarman's estate: sale of nine messuages in parish of St Giles in the Fields (Middlesex) and settling lands in Whipsnade, Totternhoe and Studham (Bedfordshire) in lieu.	c. 19
	William Carey's estate: vesting manor of Yeovillton (Somerset) and other lands in trustees for discharging incumbrances, making provision for younger children and settling other lands in Devon in lieu.	c. 33

1704 (3 & 4 Ann.)

Public Acts

| {{|Annuities, etc. Act 1704|public|14|24-10-1704|note3=|repealed=y|archived=n|}}
| {{|Bill of Exchange Act 1704|public|8|24-10-1704|note3=|repealed=y|archived=n|}}
| {{|Correspondence with Enemies Act 1704|public|13|24-10-1704|note3=|repealed=y|archived=n|}}
| {{|Exportations, etc. Act 1704|public|7|24-10-1704|note3=|repealed=y|archived=n|}}
| {{|Grant to Duke of Marlborough Act 1704|public|4|24-10-1704|note3=|repealed=y|archived=n|}}
| {{|Importation Act 1704|public|9|24-10-1704|note3=|repealed=y|archived=n|}}
| {{|Land Tax Act 1704|public|1|24-10-1704|note3=|repealed=y|archived=n| |note4= }}
| {{|Militia Act 1704|public|15|24-10-1704|note3=|repealed=y|archived=n|}}
| {{|Mutiny Act 1704|public|5|24-10-1704|note3=|repealed=y|archived=n|}}
| {{|Perpetuation and Amendment of Acts, 1704|public|16|24-10-1704|note3=|repealed=y|archived=n|}}
| {{|Recruiting Act 1704|public|10|24-10-1704|note3=|repealed=y|archived=n|}}
| {{|Taxation Act 1704|public|3|24-10-1704|note3=|repealed=y|archived=n| |note4= }}
| {{|Taxation Act 1704|public|17|24-10-1704|note3=|repealed=y|archived=n|}}
| {{|Taxation Act 1704|public|18|24-10-1704|note3=|repealed=y|archived=n|}}
| {{|Thomas Pitkin's Bankruptcy Act 1704|public|11|24-10-1704|note3=|repealed=y|archived=n|}}
| {{|Trade with France Act 1704|public|12|24-10-1704|note3=|repealed=y|archived=n|}}
| {{|Union of England and Scotland Act 1704|public|6|24-10-1704|note3=|repealed=y|archived=n|}}
}}

Private Acts
	Ambrose Scudamore's estate: sale for the payment of mortgage and debts and for application of the residue.	c. 23
	Amendment of an Act concerning Sir Peter and Thomas Tyrrell's estate [1703 c. 30].	c. 53
	Augmentation of Gainsborough (Lincolnshire) Vicarage.	c. 21
	Baldwin and William Malett's estate: payment of Baldwin's debts to the Crown as he was Receiver General for Somerset and Bristol, and settling the residue on William.	c. 16
	Baptist May's estate: sale of part for repayment of Charles May his nephew.	c. 54
	Charles Bludworth's estate: sale for payment of debts.	c. 37
	Charles Earl of Burlington and Corke's estates in England and Ireland: sale for payment of debts.	c. 12
	Charles Lord Howard Baron of Escrick's estate: sale for payment of debts.	c. 11
	Confirmation of agreement between Bishop of Carlisle and Thomas Coke for vesting Melbourne rectory (Derbyshire) in Thomas Coke and his heirs on augmentation of the rents to the bishopric of Carlisle and of the stipend to the vicar of Melbourne.	c. 14
	Confirmation of and making good Hugh Nanney's will.	c. 35
	Confirmation of lease of lands in Epsom by Sir Joseph Sheldon and Sir James Edwards to Humphrey Bean and agreed to be assigned to Sir Thomas Cooke, and enabling other lands adjoining to be leased to him.	c. 56
	Confirming an agreement between John Earl of Kildare, Richard Lord Bellew and Francis his wife, Charlotte Countess of Newburgh and William Rowley, and sale of part of the Earl of Kildare's estate.	c. 13
	Daniel Drake's estate: sale for provision for widow and children.	c. 7
	Edward Baines' estate: sale of part for discharge of a mortgage and making provision for his daughters.	c. 27
	Empowering the Treasury to compound with John Mason, former Receiver General for the county, university and town of Cambridge and Isle of Ely, and with John Silkman one of his sureties.	c. 36
	Empowering the Treasury to compound with Michael Wicks late Receiver General of the Plantation Duties in the Port of London. 	c. 61
	Empowering the Treasury to compound with Richard Cobb a surety for Thomas Cobb deceased Receiver General for Hampshire and the Isle of Wight.	c. 17
	Empowering the Treasury to compound with Sir Michael Biddulph a former surety for Morgan Whitley Receiver General for Cheshire and North Wales.	c. 19
	Empowering the Treasury to compound with the sureties for Augustine Briggs Receiver General for Norfolk and Norwich.	c. 18
	Empowering the Treasury to compound with Thomas Kenyon executor of Luke Lloyd formerly a surety of Morgan Whitley formerly Receiver General for Cheshire and North Wales.	c. 58
	Empowering the Treasury to compound with Thomas Whitley a former surety for Morgan Whitley late Receiver General for Cheshire and North Wales.	c. 22
	Enabling Agnes Hacche, widow, and other trustees to make leases and sell lands in Devon for payment of Robert Hacche's debts and legacies and for the maintenance and advancement of his daughters' portions.	c. 5
	Enabling Edmond Waller to charge his estate with payment of his debts.	c. 42
	Enabling James Lockhart and his wife to sell lands in Essex formerly belonging to Sir Thomas Luckin for payment of their debts, and to purchase other lands to be settled to the same uses.	c. 25
	Enabling John Lord Poulett and Bridget his wife to sell their interest in certain manors and lands in Kent and to purchase others to be settled to the same uses.	c. 10
	Enabling Sir George Warburton to sell the manor of Pulford (Cheshire) for payment of portions according to his marriage agreement and his father's debts.	c. 50
	Enabling trustees to raise money to pay Mark Delves's debts.	c. 29
	Enabling William Cavendish to make a settlement in jointure when he marries, and for better raising the portions charged on his estate and for confirming the enfranchisement of copyhold estates made by his father in the manor of Dovebridge (Staffordshire and Derbyshire).	c. 49
	Estate of Thomas Goddard of Rudlow (Wiltshire): sale of lands for the payment of debts and for settling residue on Ambrose Goddard.	c. 30
	Estate of William and Clare Trafford and their eldest son William: better explanation of the settlement and making more effectual a provision for younger children.	c. 47
	Estate of William Duke of Devonshire and William Cavendish Marquis of Hartington: mortgage for payment of debts.	c. 9
	Estates of Mathew Lister and Timothy Whitfield and their wives: sale of lands in Heston (Middlesex) for purposes mentioned.	c. 24
	For settling lands and fishery rights in the Society of the Governor and Assistants London of the new Plantation in Ulster, and an annual rentcharge of £250 on the Lord Bishop of Derry.	c. 1
	George Nodes' estate: sale of lands in Hertfordshire for payment of his and his father's debts.	c. 31
	James Griffin's estate: leasing part of the manor of Dingley and lands there for payment of debts and raising portions for younger children.	c. 46
	John Green's estates: sale of some in Hacklestone (Wiltshire) and settling others in Gavellacre (Hampshire) to the same uses.	c. 44
	John Proctor's estate: sale of lands in Shawdon, Shawdon Woodhouse and Crawley (Northumberland) upon settling others in the county in lieu.	c. 39
	John Sands' estate in Surrey: sale of part for payment of debts and raising a portion for his daughter.	c. 40
	Joseph and Elizabeth Grainge's estate: sale for maintenance of Elizabeth pursuant to their marriage settlement and application of the residue for payment of Joseph's debts.	c. 59
	Joseph Hinxman's estates in Hampshire: sale of some in Andover and settling others in Christchurch, Twyneham, to the same uses.	c. 32
	Joseph Pince's estate: sale of estates in Devon and city and county of Exeter for payment of debts and legacies and for a provision for himself, his wife and his family.	c. 51
	Mortgage of a plantation in Barbados for payment of Robert Hooper's debts.	c. 26
	Moses Gould's estate: confirming agreement for payment of his debts and maintenance of his younger children and for settling another part of the estate.	c. 6
	Naturalization of Andrew Girardot or Devermenoux, Francis Buzelin and others.	c. 52
	Naturalization of Henry Bowman.	c. 8
	Naturalization of Louise Mary Cresset.	c. 3
	Naturalization of Margarita Cadogan, Gilbert Alfleck and John Louis.	c. 45
	Naturalization of Thomas Levingston Viscount Teviott.	c. 2
	Patricious Crowe's estate: sale of lands in Durham and Northumberland for raising portions for younger children.	c. 33
	Richard and Frances Pate (his wife) Lister's estate in Cheshire and Chester: sale for payment of the debts of Frances' father Sir Thomas Smith, raising portions for her younger children and purchasing other lands to be settled to the same uses.	c. 60
	Richard and Thomas Williams' estate: sale of manors and lands in Herefordshire, Radnorshire and Brecknockshire for payment of debts.	c. 15
	Richard Ball's estate: sale of estate in Little Appleby and Great Appleby in Derbyshire and Leicestershire, purchase of another to be settled to the same uses and laying out the residue to make provision for younger children.	c. 41
	Separating the churches or chapels of Horne and Bletchingley (Surrey).	c. 28
	Settling Frankton (Warwickshire) tithes upon Simon Biddulph and a rentcharge in lieu upon the present rector and his successors.	c. 20
	Sir Thomas and his son John Worsop's estate in Finsbury Fields or Moorfields in the parish of Shoreditch (Middlesex): sale for payment of debts and legacies and purchase of another in Ireland.	c. 57
	Thomas Burr's estate: repayment of mortgage..	c. 34
	Thomas Freke's estate: power to grant leases, enabling George Pitt's son to make a jointure out of the estate when he marries, establishing a school in Iwerne Courtney and augmenting the vicarage of Cerne Abbas (Dorset). 	c. 4
	Thomas Guy's estate: sale for payment of debts.	c. 38
	Thomas Hatcher's estate: sale or mortgage of part for payment of debts and for the better execution of his marriage settlement.	c. 43
	Thomas Holford's estate in Plumbly and elsewhere in Cheshire: sale for payment of debts and purchase of another to be settled to the same uses.	c. 55
	William Lenthal's estate: sale of manor of Latchford and lands in Latchford and Haseley (Oxfordshire) for discharge of incumbrances.	c. 48

1705 (4 & 5 Ann.)

Public Acts

| {{|Bankruptcy Act 1705|public|4|25-10-1705|note3=|repealed=y|archived=n|}}
| {{|Chester Highways. Act 1705|public|26|25-10-1705|note3=|repealed=y|archived=n|}}
| {{|Collection of Charity Money Act 1705|public|25|25-10-1705|note3=|repealed=y|archived=n|}}
| {{|Eddystone Lighthouse Act 1705|public|7|25-10-1705|note3=|repealed=y|archived=n|}}
| {{|Exportation Act 1705|public|19|25-10-1705|note3=|repealed=y|archived=n|}}
| {{|Fish Act 1705|public|8|25-10-1705|note3=|repealed=y|archived=n|}}
| {{|Forfeited Estates, Ireland Act 1705|public|11|25-10-1705|note3=|repealed=y|archived=n|}}
| {{|Land Tax Act 1705|public|1|25-10-1705|note3=|repealed=y|archived=n| |note4= }}
| {{|Militia Act 1705|public|10|25-10-1705|note3=|repealed=y|archived=n|}}
| {{|Mutiny Act 1705|public|22|25-10-1705|note3=|repealed=y|archived=n|}}
| {{|Navy Act 1705|public|6|25-10-1705|note3=|repealed=y|archived=n|}}
| {{|Parton Harbour, Cumberland. Act 1705|public|5|25-10-1705|note3=|repealed=y|archived=n|}}
| {{|Payment of Certain Regiments Act 1705|public|12|25-10-1705|note3=|repealed=y|archived=n|}}
| {{|Princess Sophia, Naturalization Act 1705|public|14|25-10-1705|note3=|repealed=y|archived=n|}}
| {{|Princess Sophia Naturalization Act 1705|public|16|25-10-1705|note3=|repealed=y|archived=n|Act for the Naturalization of the Most Excellent Princess Sophia, Electress and Duchess Dowager of Hanover, and the Issue of her Body}}
| {{|Private (See of Dublin) Act 1705|public|13|25-10-1705|note3=|repealed=y|archived=n|}}
| {{|Recruiting Act 1705|public|21|25-10-1705|note3=|repealed=y|archived=n|}}
| {{|Regency Act 1705|public|8|25-10-1705|note3=|repealed=y|archived=n|}}
| {{|River Stower Navigation Act 1705|public|2|25-10-1705|note3=|repealed=y|archived=n|}}
| {{|Taxation Act 1705|public|17|25-10-1705|note3=|repealed=y|archived=n|}}
| {{|Taxation Act 1705|public|18|25-10-1705|note3=|repealed=y|archived=n|}}
| {{|Taxation, etc. Act 1705|public|23|25-10-1705|note3=|repealed=y|archived=n|}}
| {{|Thames Watermen Act 1705|public|24|25-10-1705|note3=|repealed=y|archived=n|}}
| {{|The Mint Act 1705|public|9|25-10-1705|note3=|repealed=y|archived=n|}}
| {{|Union of England and Scotland Act 1705|public|15|25-10-1705|note3=|repealed=y|archived=n|}}
}}

Private Acts
	Arthur Vaughan's (an infant) estate: sale for the payment of debts and incumbrances.	c. 56
	Bugden: to enable John Williams, an infant, to renew a lease of the parsonage, to settle the prebend of Budgen as an augmentation for the vicar and to vest the ecclesiastical jurisdiction of the parish in Bishop of Lincoln.	c. 45
	Christopher and Christopher (his son) Reve's estate: sale for payment of their debts and legacies and for making provision for Christopher the younger's widow, Dorothy, and his infant son.	c. 55
	Christopher Fairfax's estate: sale of the manor of Estevening and other lands in Swinehead (Lincolnshire) for payment of debts and benefit of children.	c. 58
	Christopher Pegg's estate: sale of manor and estate of and in Hattersedge and Dore (Derbyshire), and mortgaging of part of manor and estate of and in Beauchiff and Strawberry Lee (Derbyshire) for payment of debts and incumbrances and making provision for family.	c. 35
	Clarification of an Act concerning Mathew Holworthy's estate [1703 c. 34].	c. 41
	Confirmation of the marriage agreement of Charles and Dorothy Owen of Nash (Pembrokeshire).	c. 7
	Correction and explanation of an Act concerning Thomas Cobb's debts [1704 c. 17].	c. 65
	Edward Earl of Conway's will: making the exemplification of it and related depositions evidence in equity and at law.	c. 19
	Elizabeth Hicks' estate: sale of houses and lands in and near Portsmouth for payment of a debt and purchasing other lands to be settled to the same uses.	c. 49
	Elizabeth Hore's estate in Buckinghamshire: sale for the payment of debts.	c. 57
	Empowering the Treasury to compound with Thomas Tomkins and John Chagneau and their securities for the debts owing by them to Her Majesty.	c. 48
	Empowering the Treasury to compound with Francis Clyes surety for William Penneck late of Exeter in six bonds for duties on tobacco had at Falmouth in December 1701.	c. 64
	Empowering Thomas Cary and George Hartley to import a quantity of French wines from Copenhagen contracted for before 1 January 1704.	c. 29
	Enabling James Duke of Ormond and Charles Earl of Arran to settle fee farm rents in Tipperary (Ireland) pursuant to the earl's marriage agreement, and making good several grants in fee farm by the earl.	c. 17
	Enabling John Brett Fisher and Judith his wife to sell lands for payment of his debts and making provision for his wife and future children.	c. 44
	Enabling John Edwards to sell lands in Norfolk for payment of debts.	c. 10
	Enabling Scrope Viscount Howe to make a certain provision for daughters by his first wife expressed in the marriage settlement as uncertain and contingent.	c. 20
	Enabling Sir John Humble and his trustees to settle lands in Lincolnshire, Surrey and Kent pursuant to his marriage settlement with Dame Sarah his wife.	c. 25
	Enabling Sir Thomas Cave to sell lands in Northamptonshire for payment of siblings' portions and settlement of other lands in Northamptonshire and Leicestershire to the same uses.	c. 6
	Enabling William Gomeldon to sell a farm in Kent to discharge an incumbrance on it and to pay his debts.	c. 36
	Estate of Valentine Crome of Maiden Early (Berkshire): sale for payment of father's debts and making a provision for him and his brother.	c. 51
	Evelyn Earl of Kingston-upon-Hull's estate: vesting lands in Acton (Middlesex) in trustees.	c. 18
	Exchange of parsonage house and glebe lands belonging to Watton at Stone rectory (Hertfordshire) for another house and lands in Watton at Stone belonging to Philip Boteler.	c. 5
	Foulke and his son Meredith Wynne's estate (Denbighshire): sale of part for the payment of debts and settlement of residue pursuant to marriage articles.	c. 54
	Freedom of ship "L'Amazone" taken and condemned as prize and sold in the Island of Barbados.7	c. 66
	Henry Lord Colerane's estate in Ireland: sale of part and supply of the want of enrollment of a deed concerning another part.	c. 22
	Henry Raper's estate: taking the estate in law of a mortgage made by John Sands which is descended to the infant daughters and coheirs of John Pargiter Henry's trustees.	c. 47
	Humphrey Courtney's estate: sale for discharge of mortgages, debts and incumbrances on it.	c. 37
	James Hamilton's estate: sale of part for payment of debts and raising portions for younger children and for making fee farms and leases for lives during his minority.	c. 8
	John Abington's estate: vesting certain terms for 40 years in trustees, empowering them to grant and renew leases and raising portions for his younger children.	c. 27
	John Asgill's relief relating to his purchase of part of the forfeited estates in Ireland.	c. 13
	John Ballet's estate: sale of lands for faster payment of debts and raising portions for younger children.	c. 52
	John Digby's estate in Leicestershire: sale of lands for the discharge of mortgages and incumbrances.	c. 28
	John Holworthy's debts: vesting £2000 in trustees for payment of debts.	c. 61
	John Stanhope's estate: sale of lands in Lincolnshire for payment of debts.	c. 46
	John Viccary's estate in Rockbear (Devon): sale for payment of debts and maintenance of widow and children.	c. 63
	Lichfield Chapter Act 1706.	c. 33
	Michael Sorocold's estate: sale of an advowson in Sussex for payment of debts and making provision for his widow and child.	c. 62
	Morris Goulston's estate: vesting in trustees for raising sisters' portions and the payment of debts.	c. 38
	Naturalization of Adelaide Duchess of Shrewsbury.	c. 4
	Naturalization of Peter Silvestre.	c. 3
	Naturalization of William Burnet.	c. 2
	Naturalization of William Lewis Legrand.	c. 14
	Naturalizing Jacob Pechells and others.	c. 16
	Naturalizing Paul Francis and Katherine Risley.	c. 67
	Naturalizing Vincent De Laymerie and others.	c. 68
	Nicholas Row's estate: sale of lands in Devon and Cornwall and application of proceeds for uses of marriage settlement and payment of debts.	c. 39
	Ralph Baldwin's estate: vesting part in trustees for a provision for younger children.	c. 59
	Relief of Colonel John Rice.	c. 40
	Relief of Colonel Samuel Venner.	c. 15
	Relief of non commission officers and private soldiers of Lord Drogheda's and Colonel Coot's Regiments.	c. 34
	Relief of Sir Stephen Evance and Henry Cornish.	c. 12
	Richard Bold's estate: lease, sale or mortgage for raising portions, debts and monies to which it is liable.	c. 26
	Richard Lord Bulkeley Viscount Cashel's estate in Cheshire: enlarging a power to lease for performance of the trusts on the estate.	c. 21 
	Richard Thornhill's estate: sale of lands in Kent for payment of debts and his sisters' portions, and securing residue of the purchase money to the uses of his marriage settlement.	c. 43
	Robert and Anne Barry's estate: settling of part for the benefit of Anne and her children and sale of the other part of Robert's estate for payment of his debts.	c. 60
	Settlement of impropriate tithes of St. Bride parish, London.	c. 32
	Sir Edwin Sadleir's estate: sale of the manor of Temple Dinsley and other lands in Hertfordshire for the payment of debts.	c. 24
	Supplying a defect in the appointment of provisions for Henry Smalman's younger children and making such provisions more effectual.	c. 9
	Thomas Chute's estate in Warwickshire: sale and purchase of other lands in Norfolk to be settled to the same uses.	c. 1
	Thomas Deane's estate: sale of lands in Hampshire and Dorset for the payment of debts and legacies.	c. 31
	Thomas Gower's estate: sale for payment of debts and settling the residue for the benefit of his daughters.	c. 50
	To permit the making of clothes with cloth buttons for export for clothing the army of the allies notwithstanding the Act against cloth buttons [1698 c. 2].	c. 11
	To remedy the defect of a common recovery suffered by Philip Smith, Viscount Strangford, and his eldest son, George, and of the deed which declared its uses.	c. 23
	William and Thomas Lambard's estate: assurance of part of lands in Kent, assurance of other lands in lieu of another part and for better provision for younger children.	c. 53
	William Forbes' estate: sale of manor of Barnwick Hall and other lands in Essex and purchasing others to be settled to the same uses.	c. 42
	William Huggessen's estate: provision for payment of debts, raising portions for younger sons and making good the intended marriage settlement of his son William.	c. 30

1706 (6 Ann.)

Public Acts

| {{|Annuity, Duke of Marlborough Act 1706|public|6|03-12-1706|note3=|repealed=y|archived=n|}}
| {{|Apprehension of Housebreakers Act 1706|public|31|03-12-1706|note3=|repealed=y|archived=n|}}
| {{|Bankrupts Act 1706|public|22|03-12-1706|note3=|repealed=y|archived=n|}}
| {{|Bedfordshire and Buckinghamshire Roads Act 1706|public|4|03-12-1706|note3=|repealed=y|archived=n|}}
| {{|Bedfordshire Highways Act 1706|public|13|03-12-1706|note3=|repealed=y|archived=n|}}
| {{|British Museum Act 1706|public|30|03-12-1706|note3=|repealed=y|archived=n|An Act for the better securing her Majesty's Purchase of Cotton House in Westminster.}}
| {{|Burglaries, etc. Act 1706|public|9|03-12-1706|note3=|repealed=y|archived=n|}}
| {{|Continuance of Acts, 1706|public|34|03-12-1706|note3=|repealed=y|archived=n|}}
| {{|Crown Lands, Forfeited Estates (Ireland) Act 1706|public|25|03-12-1706|note3=|repealed=y|archived=n|}}
| {{|Duke of Marlborough; Pension Act 1706|public|7|03-12-1706|note3=|repealed=y|archived=n|}}
| {{|Duties on Salt, etc. Act 1706|public|29|03-12-1706|note3=|repealed=y|archived=n|}}
| {{|Game Act 1706|public|16|03-12-1706|note3=|repealed=y|archived=n|}}
| {{|Hertfordshire Highways Act 1706|public|14|03-12-1706|note3=|repealed=y|archived=n|}}
| {{|Importation Act 1706|public|19|03-12-1706|note3=|repealed=y|archived=n|}}
| {{|Maintenance of Church of England Act 1706|public|8|03-12-1706|note3=|repealed=n|archived=n|An Act for securing the Church of England as by Law established.}}
| {{|Militia Act 1706|public|28|03-12-1706|note3=|repealed=y|archived=n|}}
| {{|Mutiny Act 1706|public|18|03-12-1706|note3=|repealed=y|archived=n|}}
| {{|New Palace Yard, Westminster. Act 1706|public|15|03-12-1706|note3=|repealed=y|archived=n|}}
| {{|Prison (Escape) Act 1706|public|12|03-12-1706|note3=|repealed=y|archived=n|An Act for rendring more effectual an Act passed in the First Year of Her Majesties reign intituled An Act for the better preventing Escapes out of the Queen's Bench and Fleet Prisons.}}
| {{|Queen Anne's Bounty Act 1706|public|24|03-12-1706|note3=|repealed=y|archived=n|An Act for discharging small Livings from their First Fruits and Tenths and all Arrears thereof.}}
| {{|Recruiting Act 1706|public|17|03-12-1706|note3=|repealed=y|archived=n|}}
| {{|Royal Lustring Company Act 1706|public|3|03-12-1706|note3=|repealed=y|archived=n|}}}
| {{|Taxation Act 1706|public|1|03-12-1706|note3=|repealed=y|archived=n| |note4= }}
| {{|Taxation Act 1706|public|2|03-12-1706|note3=|repealed=y|archived=n| |note4= }}
| {{|Taxation Act 1706|public|5|03-12-1706|note3=|repealed=y|archived=n| |note4= }}
| {{|Taxation Act 1706|public|21|03-12-1706|note3=|repealed=y|archived=n| |note4= }}
| {{|Taxation Act 1706|public|27|03-12-1706|note3=|repealed=y|archived=n| |note4= }}
| {{|Thomas Brerewood's Estate and Thomas Pitkins' Creditors Act 1706|public|23|03-12-1706|note3=|repealed=y|archived=n|}}
| {{|Union with Scotland Act 1706|public|11|03-12-1706|note3=|repealed=n|archived=n|An Act for a Union of the Two Kingdoms of England and Scotland}}
| {{|Vagrants Act 1706|public|32|03-12-1706|note3=|repealed=y|archived=n|}}
| {{|Wiltshire Highways Act 1706|public|26|03-12-1706|note3=|repealed=y|archived=n|}}
| {{|Yarmouth Coal Import Duties (Freemen, etc.) Act 1706|public|10|03-12-1706|note3=|repealed=y|archived=n|}}
| {{|Yorkshire (West Riding) Land Registry Act 1706|public|20|03-12-1706|note3=|repealed=y|archived=n|}}
}}

Private Acts
	Administration in England of Thomas Maule's oath of office as Remembrancer of the Court of Exchequer in Ireland.	c. 8
	Ann Winwood's estate: sale of lands at Cole Green within the manor of Hertingfordbury (Hertfordshire) and the manor and rectory of Hertingfordbury for the payment of a mortgage and bond debt, and for purchasing other lands to be settled to the same uses.	c. 30
	Better discovery of John Aynsworth's estate, late of London, merchant.	c. 42
	Better support and maintenance of the minister of Tettenhall (Staffordshire).	c. 28 
	Correction of an Act concerning Edward Baines' estate [1704 c. 27].	c. 35
	Dame Elizabeth Rich's charity: transfer of charge of £2000 from lands in Worcestershire to lands in Berkshire.	c. 11
	Daniel and Jane King's marriage settlement: sale of lands and purchase of others to be settled to the same uses, and payment of two sums of £4,000 and £2,000 mentioned in the settlement.	c. 37
	Daniel Thomas' estate: settlement for the benefit of his wife and children.	c. 16
	Empowering the Treasury to compound with Nathaniel Rich late Receiver General for the county of Essex.	c. 18
	Enabling Henry Earl of Thomond, an infant, to make a settlement of his estate on his marriage.	c. 9
	Enabling Henry Pye to make a jointure.	c. 22
	Enabling the Treasury to compound with Benjamin Niccoll and his sureties for his debt to Her Majesty.	c. 6
	Enabling the Treasury to compound with John Crosse and his sureties for his debt to Her Majesty.	c. 43
	Enabling the Treasury to compound with John Pye and his sureties for his and their debt to Her Majesty.	c. 45
	Enabling Thomas Clark, an infant, to lease a house in St. Mary Axe, London, to Sir Jeffrey Jeffreyes.	c. 39
	Estate in Ratcliffe Culey (Leicestershire): sale and settling of another in lieu.	c. 26
	Estates of William Pierrepont and Charles Egerton: confirming partitions of lands in Suffolk, Kent and Surrey, and enabling William and Samuel Pierrepont, infants, to partition and sell land in other counties and to purchase other lands to be settled to the same uses, and for correcting a mistake in William Peck's marriage settlement.	c. 25
	Freedom of ship "Neptune Privateer" a foreign built ship lately bought as a wreck.	c. 3
	Freedom of ship "Prince"(foreign built).	c. 20
	Freedom of ship "Supply".	c. 32
	Freedom of ship "Vigilantia" of Stad (Germany), lately a wreck.	c. 4
	Gilbert Charlton's estate: sale of an estate in Montgomeryshire and purchase of others in Nottinghamshire, Leicestershire or Lincolnshire to be settled to the same uses as the Montgomeryshire estate.	c. 36
	Henry Darell's estate: sale of part and lease or mortgage of another part for the payment of debts and making provision for widow and younger children.	c. 13
	Henry Duke of Beaufort's estate: transfer of charge for his daughters' and younger children's portions from certain manors and lands to others.	c. 21
	Henry Neville: change of name to Grey.	c. 2
	John Canham's estate: supplying the defect in an appointment for the provision for younger children pursuant to his marriage settlement, and settlement of an estate in Totteridge.	c. 12
	John Weedon's estate: sale of part for payment of father's debts and legacies and portions to younger children, and settling residue to the uses of his father's voluntary settlement.	c. 38
	Making more effectual William, bishop of Oxford's settlement for his children.	c. 10
	Mountague Drake's estate (Kent): sale of lands for the payment of debts and legacies.	c. 41
	Naturalizing Henry Van Holte and others.	c. 48
	Naturalizing John Thomeur and others.	c. 47
	Naturalizing John Tigh.	c. 5
	Naturalizing of Maria Margaret, Lady North and Grey.	c. 1
	Naturalizing Philip Vanden Enden.	c. 31
	Rebuilding Humberston parish church (Lincolnshire) and settling a rentcharge on the bishop of Lincoln in lieu of the rectory of Humberston.	c. 40
	Relief of Alexander Pendarvis in relation to £5000 from lands in Ireland. 	c. 27
	Relief of Elizabeth Wandesford and Elizabeth Foulk.	c. 46
	Relief of John Baker and his family.	c. 19
	Relief of Sir John Mead.	c. 7
	Richard Lee's (an infant) estate: enabling his mother Agnes Lee to renew certain leases for lives.	c. 15
	Robert Hitch's estate: exchange of lands in Yorkshire.	c. 34
	Vesting lands in Chelsea in the Queen for Chelsea College and vesting other lands in John Earl of Carbury.	c. 24
	William Elson's (an infant) estate: sale of part for payment of his father's debts.	c. 44
	William Eyre's (a lunatic) estate: sale of certain mills and lands in Downton (Wiltshire) for the payment of debts, making provision for his eldest son and for purchasing other lands to be settled to the same uses.	c. 29
	William Fitch's estate in Dorset: sale of part for the payment of sister's portion and other debts, for preserving the residue and settling certain tithes in the Isle of Wight to the same uses.	c. 14
	William Hide's estate: sale of mansion house and lands in Middlesex for the better maintenance and present provision of children.	c. 33
	William Pott's estate: sale of part for discharging his siblings' portions and his debts and for confirming his marriage settlement..	c. 23
	William Williams' estate: sale of houses near Aldgate, London, and purchase of lands in lieu.	c. 17

See also
List of Acts of the Parliament of England

References

External links
The Statutes at Large
- Volume 10 - 8 William III to 2 Anne - 1696-7 to 1703
- Volume 11 - 2 Anne to 8 Anne - 1703 to 1709 - also

 
1700
1700s in England